Christmas Songs is the second Christmas album released by Filipino singer-actress Nora Aunor in 1972. It was released through Alpha Records Corporation in the Philippines in LP format and later released in a compilation/CD format.  The album contains some of the most famous traditional Christmas carols.

Track listing

Side one

Side two

References

See also
 Nora Aunor discography

Nora Aunor albums
1972 albums